Carmela Shamir was the first female Israeli ambassador to Uzbekistan. In 2021, she was named Consul General to Munich, Germany,

Diplomatic career
Carmela Shamir was Israel's ambassador to Uzbekistan from 2013 until 2017.  Her deputy ambassador, Hagit Mualem, was also a woman.

Before serving as ambassador she  was deputy director of the North American department at Israel's Ministry of Foreign Affairs.

See also
Women of Israel

References

Israeli women ambassadors
Ambassadors of Israel to Uzbekistan
Year of birth missing (living people)
Living people
Israeli consuls